Triston Casas (born January 15, 2000) is an American professional baseball first baseman for the Boston Red Sox of Major League Baseball (MLB). The Red Sox selected him in the first round of the 2018 MLB draft and he made his MLB debut in 2022. Casas was a member of the United States national baseball team at the 2020 Summer Olympics, which won the silver medal.

Amateur career
Casas played high school baseball at American Heritage School in Plantation, Florida, where he played both corner infield positions. In two varsity seasons at American Heritage, Casas had a .414 batting average with 11 home runs and 53 runs batted in (RBIs) in 53 games played. He reclassified and graduated high school a year early to be eligible for the Major League Baseball (MLB) draft. He played in the Under Armour All-America Baseball Game in both 2016 and 2017.

Professional career
The Boston Red Sox chose Casas in the first round, with the 26th overall selection, of the 2018 MLB draft. He signed with the Red Sox, receiving a $2,552,800 signing bonus, the full slot value for the pick. He was assigned to Boston's Rookie League team, the Gulf Coast League Red Sox. In a game on June 25, Casas was injured while playing third base; he subsequently underwent season-ending surgery on June 29, to repair a torn ulnar collateral ligament in his right thumb.

Casas began 2019 with the Greenville Drive of the Class A South Atlantic League. In early June, he was named to the South Atlantic League All-Star Game. In mid-June, Casas was added to the top 100 prospects list of Baseball America, at number 98. In late August, he was named a South Atlantic League Postseason All-Star, and recognition from Baseball America as the Red Sox 2019 Minor League Player Of The Year. On September 1, Casas was promoted to the Class A-Advanced Salem Red Sox. In mid-September, he was named the Red Sox' minor league offensive player of the year. Over 122 games between the two clubs, Casas slashed .254/.349/.476 with 20 home runs and 81 RBIs.

During 2020, with no minor league season due to the COVID-19 pandemic shutdown, the Red Sox added Casas to their pool of reserve players on August 20, so he could participate in intra-squad workouts. He was subsequently invited to participate in the Red Sox' fall instructional league. Following the 2020 season, Casas was ranked by Baseball America as the Red Sox' number one prospect. Casas began the 2021 season in Double-A with the Portland Sea Dogs. In addition to playing 77 games for Portland, Casas also appeared in nine games for the Triple-A Worcester Red Sox, batting a combined .279 with 14 home runs and 59 RBIs. After the regular season, Casas was selected to play in the Arizona Fall League, and was named the starting first baseman for the East team in the league's annual Fall Stars Game.

The Red Sox invited Casas to spring training as a non-roster player in 2022. He returned to Worcester to start the season. In May 2022, he was ranked 18th in the list of baseball's top 100 prospects by Baseball America. Casas sustained a high ankle sprain in mid-May, causing him to miss over a month of playing time. The Red Sox promoted Casas to the major leagues on September 4, and he made his MLB debut that day. In 27 games with Boston, he batted .197 with five home runs and 12 RBIs. In 72 games with Triple-A Worcester, he batted .273 with 11 home runs and 38 RBIs. After the season, he played for Tigres del Licey in the Dominican Winter League. In January 2023, he was ranked 29th in the Baseball America list of top 100 prospects.

International career
Casas played on the 18-under United States national baseball team, and was named the Most Valuable Player of the 2017 U-18 Baseball World Cup.

In May 2021, Casas was named to the roster of the United States national baseball team for the qualifiers to the baseball tournament at the 2020 Summer Olympics, contested in 2021 in Tokyo. After the team qualified, he was named to the Olympics roster on July 2. During the tournament, Casas hit home runs against South Korea, Japan, and the Dominican Republic. The team went on to win silver, losing to hosts Japan in the gold medal game.

References

Further reading

External links
, or SoxProspects.com
 
 Casas (#44) batting in his first GCL Red Sox game

2000 births
Living people
Sportspeople from Pembroke Pines, Florida
Baseball players from Florida
Major League Baseball first basemen
Boston Red Sox players
Gulf Coast Red Sox players
Greenville Drive players
Salem Red Sox players
Portland Sea Dogs players
Worcester Red Sox players
Scottsdale Scorpions players
Florida Complex League Red Sox players
Tigres del Licey players
United States national baseball team players
Baseball players at the 2020 Summer Olympics
Olympic baseball players of the United States
Medalists at the 2020 Summer Olympics
Olympic silver medalists for the United States in baseball
American Heritage School (Florida) alumni
American expatriate baseball players in the Dominican Republic